10 Tracks to Echo in the Dark is the sixth studio album by British rock band The Kooks. The follow-up to the 2018 album Let's Go Sunshine, it was produced by Tobias Kuhn and the band's lead singer Luke Pritchard, and released on 22 July 2022 through the band's independent label Lonely Cat with distribution by AWAL. It is the first album recorded by the band as a trio following the departure of bassist Pete Denton in late 2018.

Background
Following the Brexit referendum, Luke Pritchard wanted to maintain The Kooks' European connection by going to Berlin to work with writer and producer Tobias Kuhn. After coming up with five tracks, the COVID-19 pandemic brought work to a halt in March 2020, which meant Pritchard had to return to the U.K. and continue the writing sessions with Kuhn via Zoom. Afterwards, Kuhn traveled to London to record with the band.

Release
With a desire to do new things, The Kooks chose to release the songs from 10 Tracks to Echo in the Dark as a series of EPs. Connection - Echo in the Dark Part 1 - containing "Connection", "Jesse James" and "Modern Days" - was released on 27 January 2022, followed by Beautiful World - Echo in the Dark Part 2 containing "Closer", "Beautiful World" and "25" - on 21 April 2022. The single "Cold Heart" was released on 27 June 2022, with the remaining songs - "Oasis", "Sailing on a Dream" and "Without a Doubt" - dropping on the album's release date of 22 July 2022.

Track listing

Personnel
The Kooks
Luke Pritchard – vocals, guitar
Hugh Harris – guitar, bass, synthesizer, backing vocals
Alexis Nunez – drums, percussion, backing vocals

Additional personnel
Tobias Kuhn - production (except track 10), recording engineer (except track 10)
Victor Rådström - production (track 10), mixing (track 10)
Craig Silvey - mixing (except tracks 6, 8 and 10)
Nikodem Milewski - mixing (track 6)
Paul Mühlhaüser - mixing (track 8)
John Davis - mastering
Dani Bennett Spragg - mix engineer (except tracks 6, 8 and 10)
Rob Wilks - recording engineer (tracks 1, 4, 5, 8 and 9)
Jonas Halle - recording engineer (tracks 2, 4, 6 and 9)
Max Margolis - recording engineer (tracks 5, 6 and 9)
Darren Jones - recording engineer (track 9)

References

2022 albums
The Kooks albums